The Rooster Bridge (Tenente) in Ljubljana, the capital of Slovenia, is a footbridge crossing the Gradaščica River in the Trnovo District south of the downtown of Ljubljana. It stands between the Trnovo Bridge and the outflow of the Gradaščica into the Ljubljanica, and connects Gradaščica Street in the northern Krakovo neighbourhood (left bank) to Eipper Street in the southern Trnovo neighbourhood (right bank). These are the oldest Ljubljana suburbs, known for their market gardens and cultural events.

Name
The Rooster Bridge was named for a nearby inn (at 10 Gradaščica Street), known as Pri petelinu 'At the Rooster'. The alternate name Tenente is derived from the former Lieutenant's Inn.

History and design

A wooden footbridge stood at the site until 1931. The current structure, which replaced it in November that year, was built by the constructor Matko Curk according to plans by the architect Jože Plečnik, who had designed it as part of his Water Axis along the Ljubljanica. It is a simple iron and concrete footbridge, supported by two horseshoe-like arches and a strong fence, which consists of concrete boundary markers, linked with a metal pipe. As Plečnik's heritage, it has been protected as cultural heritage of national significance since 2009.

References

Bridges in Ljubljana
Jože Plečnik buildings
Bridges over the Gradaščica
Trnovo District
Bridges completed in 1931
Arch bridges in Slovenia
Pedestrian bridges in Slovenia
20th-century architecture in Slovenia